Fernando Aceves Humana is a Mexican painter with works in collections at the Irish Museum of Modern Art, the Museum of Contemporary Art in Panama and the Kunstmuseum Bern.

References

1969 births
Living people
Mexican painters